The Kyrgyzstan U-23 national football team is a youth football team operated under the Football Federation of the Kyrgyz Republic. The team would represent Kyrgyzstan in the Summer Olympics, AFC U-22 Asian Cup, and the Asian Games.

Competition history

Olympic record

Asian Games

Recent results and fixtures

2018

2021

Current squad 
 The following players were selected to compete in the 2018 Asian Games.
 Match date: 20 August 2018
 Opposition: 

* Over-aged player.<noinclude>

Coaching staffs

See also 
 Football Federation of the Kyrgyz Republic
 Kyrgyzstan national football team
 Kyrgyzstan women's national football team

References 

U23
Asian national under-23 association football teams